Burke's Garden is an upland valley and unincorporated community in Tazewell County, Virginia.

Geography and geology
The oval, bowl-like valley (or "cove") is known for its fertile land and was once the bed of an ancient sea. This unusual topography is similar to that of Canaan Valley in neighboring West Virginia.

Climate

According to the Köppen Climate Classification system, Burke's Garden has an oceanic climate, abbreviated "Cfb" on climate maps.

History
The area was long occupied by varying cultures of indigenous peoples.

Burke's Garden was first surveyed in 1748 by a team of surveyors working for local landowner James Patton. One of the party, James Burke an Irishman, is said to have thrown away some potato peelings while cooking. A year later, when the party returned to the area, they found potatoes growing in the area where the peels had been left.  The area was dubbed Burke's Garden as something of a joke, but the name stuck. In 1749, William Ingles went to Burke's Garden to build a house with his uncle, John Ingles. The community was an outpost of German immigrants who settled in the backcountry frontier in the late 18th century.

The area remained relatively isolated as it was not near the transportation corridors of major rivers. In the late 19th century, agents for the Vanderbilt family contacted local farmers about selling land so that the family could build a large estate there.  Nobody wanted to sell, and the Vanderbilts instead constructed their Biltmore Estate near Asheville, North Carolina.  In the 1990s, a small number of Amish families moved to Burke's Garden, but later they moved out after being unable to purchase enough land and attract enough other Amish families to form a viable community. Today Amish have returned to Burkes Garden and have a thriving community. Lines of scooters can be seen daily outside the Burkes Garden School and Community Center where the Amish now have their own school. According to Chris Wesner of AmishAmerica there Amish community consisted of about 100 persons in 2021. 

The county's oldest church, the Central Lutheran church, is located in Burke's Garden. It originally served multiple denominations so was called Union Church. When the congregation learned their Union Church had joined the Lutheran denomination most members left and established Methodist and Presbyterian churches. In 1952, the community was terrorized by the "Varmint of Burke's Garden", a large coyote that killed many local sheep and caused much damage before being killed.

The area is drained by Wolf Creek (a tributary of the New River) which flows out of the geographic bowl in a northeasterly direction.

The entire valley is listed on the National Register of Historic Places as the Burke's Garden Rural Historic District; the Burke's Garden Central Church and Cemetery is also listed on the NRHP.

See also
National Register of Historic Places listings in Tazewell County, Virginia

References

Fenneman, Nevin M. (1938), Physiography of Eastern United States, New York and London: McGraw-Hill Book Company, Inc., pp 251, 254.

External links

Historical sites in Tazewell County
The Majesty of Burke's Garden

Unincorporated communities in Tazewell County, Virginia
Valleys of Virginia
Geography of Tazewell County, Virginia
National Register of Historic Places in Tazewell County, Virginia
Unincorporated communities in Virginia